Daniel (Daniil) Kluger,  (born October 8, 1951) is an Israeli writer in science fiction and detective genres. He writes in Russian language.

Born in the former Soviet Union (Ukraine). Graduated from Simferopol State University as physicist.
Began to publish his works in the 1970s. Author of books The Cruel Sun («Жестокое солнце», изд."Таврия", 1989), The Silent Guest («Молчаливый гость», «Текст», 1991), The Trap for the Sleuth («Западня для сыщика», «Искатель», 1998), Those Who Crossed the River («Перешедшие реку», ХАМА, 2000), several detective novels - Death in Caesarea («Смерть в Кесарии»), Unpredicted Murder («Непредсказанное убийство») etc., as well as an essay on history of classical detective stories - The Baskerville Mystery («Баскервильская мистерия», «Текст», 2005). His last work, Shylock's Last Act («Последний выход Шейлока», 2005) is a detective story that takes place in a Jewish ghetto during the World War II, where heroes, witnesses and the murderer end their lives in Auschwitz.

Bibliography
 The Cruel Sun (Simpheropol: Tavria Publishers, 1989)
 The Silent Guest (Moscow: Text, 1991)
 The Trap for the Sleuth (Moscow: Iskatel, 1998)
 To Cross the River (Jerusalem: CHAMA, 2000)
 Death in Caesarea (Moscow: Vagrius, 2001)
 The Deadly Masquerade (Moscow: Vagrius, 2001)
 A Millennium on Loan (co-authored with Alexander Rybalka; Moscow: Armada-Press, 2001)
 Escape from the Art School (Moscow: Veche, 2002)
 Magical Affairs (Moscow: AST-Astrel, 2003)
 Satan's Harbor (Kiev: "U kamina", 2004)
 The Baskerville Mystery (Moscow: Text, 2005)
 Shylock's Last Act (Moscow: Text, 2006)
 Liszt's Twentieth Rhapsody, co-authored with Vitali Babenko under the joint pen name Vitali Danilin (Moscow: Club 36.6, 2006)
 Lilac's Fourth Victim, co-authored with Vitali Babenko under the joint pen name Vitali Danilin (Moscow: Club 36.6, 2007).
 Mystery of Captain Nemo (Lomonosov, 2010)
 Flying In the Dark Chambers, Coming In the Night ("Milky Way", Jerusalem, 2013)

External links
 http://www.israbard.net/israbard/personview.php?person_id=1051283268 Biography in Russian
 http://www.notes.co.il/eshed/37695.asp  Interview in Hebrew

Jewish Israeli writers
1951 births
Living people
Israeli Jews
Israeli novelists
Israeli crime fiction writers
Israeli science fiction writers
Soviet Jews
Russian-language writers
Ukrainian Jews
Ukrainian emigrants to Israel
Detective fiction writers
Crime fiction writers
Mystery writers
Israeli male writers